Esbjerg station ( or Esbjerg Station) is the main railway station in the city of Esbjerg in southwest Jutland, Denmark.

It is the terminal station on the Lunderskov–Esbjerg line and the Esbjerg–Struer line. The train services from the station are operated by DSB and Arriva, and the station serves destinations including Copenhagen, Aarhus and Ribe.

The station was opened in 1874, and the present building, designed by Heinrich Wenck, was completed in 1904. With its three-storey towers flanking the central gable, it reflects a mixture of Historicist styles, some inspired by Dutch Renaissance architecture.

History
The first railway station in Esbjerg was inaugurated in October 1874 on Exnersgade. It was the terminus of the West Jutland line (Jyske Vestbane) from Struer to Esbjerg and of the South Jutland line (Jyske Sydbane) from Lunderskov near Kolding to Esbjerg, both being built from 1872 to 1875. Opposite the first station, a number of houses were completed in the 1890s. In 1904, Wenck's new station was opened on Jernbanegade.

Architecture

Wenck's two-storey red-brick building with a slate roof has two striking towers, three storeys high, on either side of the recessed entrance. Influenced by international trends, it reflects various Historicist styles. The entrance hall with its timbered finish is reminiscent of Tyrolean designs. The building is in excellent condition following recent restoration.

Heinrich Wenck who was employed by the national railway company had completed a number of station buildings, often working with his predecessor N.P.C. Holsøe, before he designed Esbjerg station in 1902. He was influenced by the rich, National Romantic style of Martin Nyrop which drew on stately Dutch Renaissance decorations and details. Features include a central gabled section with a large lunette window flanked by twin towers. At the time, lunettes were widely used for illuminating station halls. The tall symmetrical complex has hipped roofs with smaller towers at each end. The building was completed the same year as Copenhagen Central Station with which it bears similarities.

Destinations

Esbjerg station currently serves destinations including Copenhagen, Aarhus, Ribe, Skjern and Niebüll in Germany. Both DSB and Arriva make use of Esbjerg station.

See also
 List of railway stations in Denmark

References

External links

 Banedanmark
 DSB
 Arriva

Buildings and structures in Esbjerg
Listed buildings and structures in Esbjerg Municipality
Buildings and structures completed in 1904
Railway stations in the Region of Southern Denmark
Tourist attractions in the Region of Southern Denmark
National Romantic architecture in Denmark
Historicist architecture in Denmark
Art Nouveau railway stations
Railway stations opened in 1874
1874 establishments in Denmark
Heinrich Wenck buildings
Transport in Esbjerg
Railway stations in Denmark opened in the 20th century